The El Paso Energy Building (also known as the Kinder Morgan Building) is a  high-rise office building located in Houston, Texas. It was completed in 1963 and has 33 floors. It was originally known as the Tenneco Building. It is the 28th tallest building in the city. Because of downtown Houston's diagonal street grid, all four sides of the building are exposed to the sun. The windows are recessed from the frame to control heat and glare from the sun. The footprint of the building is an exact square. Skidmore, Owings & Merrill LLP, the architects of the building, were recognized with an Honor Award from the American Institute of Architects in 1969. An elevator or an escalator were required to get to the main lobby of the building because it was raised above the street level. the first 5 floors of the building opened to make a huge glass-enclosed space. A number of drive-through bank kiosks along Louisiana Street were replaced with fountains in 1984.

History 
In 2001, the fountains were refurbished. A very long stock ticker was installed to deliver messages and add to the visual appeal in 1996 when the El Paso Corporation bought Tenneco for 4 billion dollars. When Tenneco owned the building the letters T-E-N-N-E-C-O outlined the top of the building on each of the four sides.

In 2008, Gilbain Construction started a complete remodel of the building completed in 2012. The main lobby is now located on Level 1 with entrances on Louisiana Street and Travis Street. Level 2 contains conference rooms. Levels 3 through 29 are office space and Levels 30, 31 and 32 are the Executive offices. The Exec offices boast a three story grand stairway, boardroom, many conference rooms and spacious offices and meeting areas.

Kinder Morgan purchased the building with its acquisition of El Paso Corporation in 2012. Kinder Morgan moved its headquarters to this building. EP Energy (formerly El Paso E&P Company) leases floors 18-27 from Kinder Morgan.

See also
List of tallest buildings in Houston

References

Houston Architecture

Skyscraper office buildings in Houston
Kinder Morgan
Skidmore, Owings & Merrill buildings
Office buildings completed in 1963
Leadership in Energy and Environmental Design gold certified buildings